South Gull Lake is a census-designated place (CDP) in Ross Township, Kalamazoo County, in the U.S. state of Michigan. It includes the unincorporated communities of Yorkville, Gull Lake, and Midland Park and does not have any legal status as an incorporated municipality. The population of the CDP was 1,182 at the 2010 census, down from 1,526 at the 2000 census.

Geography
The CDP is in northeastern Kalamazoo County, in the northwest part of Ross Township, and comprises area around the southern and eastern shores of Gull Lake. The lake extends into Richland Township to the west, and the northern tip crosses into Barry County, areas which are outside the CDP. A summer post office named "Yorkville" operated from 1917 to 1939.

M-89 is a state highway that forms the southern edge of the CDP, leading west  to Richland and east  to Battle Creek. Kalamazoo is 12 miles to the southwest via Richland.

South Gull Lake drains from its outlet at Yorkville via Gull Creek south to the Kalamazoo River.

Demographics

As of the census of 2000, there were 1,526 people, 643 households, and 459 families residing in the CDP. The racial makeup of the CDP was 99.48% White, 0.13% Native American, 0.07% Asian, and 0.33% from two or more races. Hispanic or Latino of any race were 1.05% of the population.

There were 643 households, out of which 27.2% had children under the age of 18 living with them, 61.7% were married couples living together, 6.4% had a female householder with no husband present, and 28.5% were non-families. 23.6% of all households were made up of individuals, and 9.3% had someone living alone who was 65 years of age or older.  The average household size was 2.37 and the average family size was 2.82.

In the CDP, the population was spread out, with 23.4% under the age of 18, 5.4% from 18 to 24, 21.0% from 25 to 44, 34.1% from 45 to 64, and 16.1% who were 65 years of age or older.  The median age was 45 years. For every 100 females, there were 94.4 males.  For every 100 females age 18 and over, there were 93.9 males.

The median income for a household in the CDP was $65,833, and the median income for a family was $85,848. Males had a median income of $46,932 versus $30,000 for females. The per capita income for the CDP was $45,175.  None of the families and 1.6% of the population were living below the poverty line, including no under eighteens and none of those over 64.

References

Unincorporated communities in Kalamazoo County, Michigan
Census-designated places in Michigan
Kalamazoo–Portage metropolitan area
Unincorporated communities in Michigan
Census-designated places in Kalamazoo County, Michigan